Oh La La! (original title: Nouvelle chance) is a 2006 French comedy-drama film directed by Anne Fontaine. It was screened out of competition at the 2006 Cannes Film Festival.

Cast
 Danielle Darrieux - Odette Saint-Gilles
 Arielle Dombasle - Bettina Fleischer
 Jean-Chrétien Sibertin-Blanc - Augustin Dos Santos
 Andy Gillet - Raphaël
 Christophe Vandevelde - Franck
 Michel Baudinat - Le prêtre
 Katsuko Nakamura - Kumiko
 Øystein Singsaas - Monsieur Wulka
 Mariana Otero - Madame Da Costa
 Philippe Storez - Philippe
 Xavier Morineau - L'employé du Ritz
 Oscar Relier - Le barman du Ritz (as Oscar Reillier)
 Nabil Massad - Le client du Ritz
 Poundo Gomis - Fille casting 1
 Vanessa Navarro - Fille casting 2

References

External links

2006 films
French comedy-drama films
2000s French-language films
2006 comedy-drama films
Films directed by Anne Fontaine
2006 comedy films
2006 drama films
2000s French films